José Quaglio, real name Giuseppe Quaglio, (28 February 1926 – 8 January 2007), was an Italian actor and theater director. He has performed in some 50 films in Italy and has directed four. He acted in a dozen films in France.

Filmography

Actor 

 1944 : L'Ange de la nuit, by André Berthomieu
 1954 : Service Entrance, by Carlo Rim
 1954 : The Count of Bragelonne, by Fernando Cerchio
 1955 : Passion de femmes, by Hans Herwig
 1956 :  Blood to the Head, by Gilles Grangier as Mimile Babin
 1957 : Three Days to Live by Gilles Grangier as an actor in the troupe
 1960 : Natercia, by Pierre Kast as Claude
 1962 : Paludi, telefilm by Gilbert Pineau as Carlo
 1963 : Vice and Virtue, by Roger Vadim
 1963 : The Terrorist by Gianfranco De Bosio
 1970 : The Conformist, by Bernardo Bertolucci
 1970 : Your Hands on My Body by Brunello Rondi as Mario
 1971 : Short Night of Glass Dolls by Aldo Lado as Valinski
 1972 : Who Saw Her Die? by Aldo Lado as Nicola Bonaiuti
 1972 : The Eroticist by Lucio Fulci as Pietro Fornari
 1973 : Woman Buried Alive by Aldo Lado as Morel
 1973 : The Assassination of Matteotti by Florestano Vancini as Questor Bertini
 1973 : Giordano Bruno (film) by Giuliano Montaldo
 1975 : Mondo candido by Gualtiero Jacopetti and Franco Prosperi as the inquisitor
 1978 : Nero veneziano by Ugo Liberatore as Father Stefani
 1992 : Max et Jérémie, by Claire Devers as Eugène Agopian
 1997 : Les Couleurs du diable, by Alain Jessua as Peter
 1997 : Homère, la dernière Odyssée, by Fabio Carpi

Theatre

Comedian 
 1946 : Les Incendiaires by Maurice Clavel, mise en scène Jean Vernier, Théâtre des Noctambules
 1950 : Henri IV by Luigi Pirandello, mise en scène André Barsacq, Théâtre de l'Atelier
 1951 : Cymbeline by William Shakespeare, mise en scène Maurice Jacquemont, théâtre National de Bretagne
 1954 : Colombe by Jean Anouilh, mise en scène André Barsacq, théâtre des Célestins, théâtre de l'Atelier 
 1955 : La Grande Felia by Jean-Pierre Conty, mise en scène Christian-Gérard, théâtre de l'Ambigu
 1957 : L'Autre Alexandre by Marguerite Liberaki, mise en scène Claude Régy, théâtre de l'Alliance française
 1958 : Plainte contre inconnu by Georges Neveux, mise en scène José Quaglio, théâtre du Vieux-Colombier

Theatre director 
 1958 : Plainte contre inconnu by Georges Neveux, théâtre du Vieux-Colombier
 1958 : Ils ont joué avec des allumettes by Marcelle Routier, théâtre de l'Alliance française
 1959 : The Killer by Eugène Ionesco, théâtre Récamier
 1961 : Le Square by Marguerite Duras, théâtre des Mathurins

External links 
 

Italian male stage actors
Italian male film actors
Italian theatre directors
People from the Province of Padua
1926 births
2007 deaths